Aghuyeh or Aghooyeh or Aghveyeh or Aghviyeh may refer to:
 Aghuyeh, East Azerbaijan
 Aghuyeh, Razavi Khorasan